Bifocals are eyeglasses with two distinct optical powers. Bifocals are commonly prescribed to people with presbyopia who also require a correction for myopia, hyperopia, and/or astigmatism.

History
Benjamin Franklin is generally credited with the invention of bifocals. He decided to saw his lenses in half so he could read the lips of speakers of French at court, the only way he could understand them. Historians have produced some evidence to suggest that others may have come before him in the invention; however, a correspondence between George Whatley and John Fenno, editor of the Gazette of the United States, suggested that Franklin had indeed invented bifocals, and perhaps 50 years earlier than had been originally thought. Despite this, the College of Optometrists concluded:
Unless further evidence emerges all we can say for certain is that Franklin was one of the first people to wear split bifocals and this act of wearing them caused his name to be associated with the type from an early date. This no doubt contributed greatly to their popularisation. The evidence implies, however, that when he sought to order lenses of this type the London opticians were already familiar with them. Other members of Franklin's circle of British friends may have worn them even earlier, from the 1760s, but it is at best uncertain (and arguably improbable?) that split bifocal lenses had a famous gentleman inventor.

Since many inventions are developed independently by more than one person, it is possible that the invention of bifocals may have been such a case.

John Isaac Hawkins, the inventor of trifocal lenses, coined the term bifocals in 1824 and credited Benjamin Franklin.

In 1955, Irving Rips of Younger Optics created the first seamless or "invisible" bifocal, a precursor to progressive lenses. This followed Howard D. Beach's 1946 work in "blended lenses", O'Conner's  "Ultex" lens in 1910, and Isaac Schnaitmann's single-piece bifocal lens in 1837.

Construction

Original bifocals were designed with the most convex lenses (for close viewing) in the lower half of the frame and the least convex lenses on the upper. Up until the beginning of the 20th century two separate lenses were cut in half and combined in the rim of the frame. The mounting of two half lenses into a single frame led to a number of early complications and rendered such spectacles quite fragile. A method for fusing the sections of the lenses together was developed by Louis de Wecker at the end of the 19th century and patented by John L. Borsch Jr. in 1908.
Today most bifocals are created by molding a reading segment into a primary lens and are available with the reading segments in a variety of shapes and sizes.

Problems

Bifocals can cause headaches and even dizziness for some wearers. Adaptation to the small field of view offered by the reading segment of bifocals can take some time, as the user learns to move either the head or the reading material rather than the eyes.  Computer monitors are generally placed directly in front of users and can lead to muscle fatigue due to the unusual straight and constant movement of the head. This trouble is mitigated by the use of monofocal lenses for computer use.

Future
Research continues in an attempt to eliminate the limited field of vision in current bifocals.  New materials and technologies may provide a method which can selectively adjust the optical power of a lens.  Researchers have constructed such a lens using a liquid crystal layer applied between two glass substrates.

Bifocals in the animal world
The aquatic larval stage of the diving beetle Thermonectus marmoratus has, in its principal eyes, two retinas and two distinct focal planes that are substantially separated (in the manner of bifocals) to switch their vision from up-close to distance, for easy and efficient capture of their prey, mostly mosquito larvae.

See also
 Binocular vision
 Binocular rivalry

References

Sources

External links
  Franklin's letters to Whatley concerning double spectacles.

Corrective lenses
Inventions by Benjamin Franklin
American inventions
18th-century inventions